Neostapfia is a genus of endemic Californian bunchgrasses, in the subfamily Chloridoideae of the grass family, Poaceae. The only known species is Neostapfia colusana, with the common name Colusa grass.

Distribution
Neostapfia colusana is endemic to the Central Valley of California, in the northern section's Sacramento Valley and in the southern section's San Joaquin Valley. The bunchgrass grows in vernal pools, which are seasonal shallow freshwater ponds.

It is native to the Central Valley counties of Glenn, Colusa, Yolo, Solano, Stanislaus, and Merced.

This rare grass is a federally listed threatened species in the United States.

Description
Neostapfia colusana is a clumping bunchgrass with distinctive cylindrical inflorescences covered in flat spikelets.

The inflorescences are said to resemble tiny ears of corn. They fruit in grains covered in a gluey secretion, and when a plant is mature each clump becomes brown and sticky with the exudate.

The genus was named for the botanist Otto Stapf.

Conservation
The plant is limited to vernal pool habitats, a type of ecosystem which is increasingly rare as Central Valley land is consumed by development and agriculture, and damaged by flood control regimes and other alterations of hydrology.

References

External links
 Calflora Database: Neostapfia colusana (Colusa grass, Colusagrass)
Jepson eFlora (JM2): Neostapfia colusana
Grass Manual Profile: Neostapfia
The Nature Conservancy — Neostapfia colusana
UC Photos gallery — Neostapfia colusana

Chloridoideae
Endemic flora of California
Native grasses of California
Bunchgrasses of North America
Natural history of the Central Valley (California)
Monotypic Poaceae genera